Miguel Rivera Mora (born 8 May 1961) is a Spanish football manager, who is currently in charge of UD Melilla.

His career was spent almost exclusively in Segunda División B, with two brief spells in interim charge of Almería in La Liga and Segunda División, respectively.

Manager career
Born in Alhaurín de la Torre, Málaga, Andalusia, Rivera began his managerial career at local CD Puerto Malagueño, and subsequently managed neighbours Juventud de Torremolinos CF. He first arrived in Segunda División B with FC Cartagena, after previous stints at Torredonjimeno CF and CD Linares.

After one full campaign in UD Melilla, Rivera was appointed Écija Balompié manager, with the club also in the third level. He remained in charge for three years, and joined fellow league team Águilas CF in June 2007.

Rivera took the club to a 6th place in the season, and subsequently was named Granada 74 CF manager. He stepped down from his role in January 2009, with the club in the relegation zones.

Rivera subsequently remained in the third division in the following years, managing Caravaca CF, CD Leganés, Écija and UD Almería B. He renewed his link with the latter on 22 May 2014, after finishing above the relegation zone.

On 9 December 2014 Rivera was appointed as an interim coach of the main squad, after Francisco's dismissal. Even after the signing of Juan Ignacio Martínez as a permanent manager, he appeared in his first professional match three days later, a 1–4 home loss against Real Madrid.

On 9 June 2015, after taking the B-side to a third position in the campaign (the best of the club's history) and an eventual elimination in the play-offs, Rivera renewed his contract for a further year. That October he had a second stint in interim charge of the first team, now in the second tier. On 21 December, however, he was sacked.

Rivera remained working in the third tier, at Linares Deportivo, Real Valladolid Promesas, UCAM Murcia CF and Mérida AD. After a league restructuring, he was appointed again at Melilla in the fourth-tier Segunda División RFEF on 22 February 2022, nearly 18 years after leaving the North African exclave.

Managerial statistics

References

External links

1961 births
Living people
Sportspeople from the Province of Málaga
Spanish football managers
FC Cartagena managers
UD Melilla managers
Écija Balompié managers
CD Leganés managers
UD Almería B managers
UD Almería managers
Caravaca CF managers